Leninsky District is the name of several administrative and municipal divisions in Russia.  The districts are named after Vladimir Lenin, the founder of the Soviet state.

Districts of the federal subjects

Leninsky District, Jewish Autonomous Oblast, an administrative and municipal district of the Jewish Autonomous Oblast
Leninsky District, Moscow Oblast, an administrative and municipal district of Moscow Oblast
Leninsky District, Tula Oblast, an administrative district of Tula Oblast
Leninsky District, Volgograd Oblast, an administrative and municipal district of Volgograd Oblast
Leninsky District, Republic of Crimea, a district in the Republic of Crimea (located on the Crimean Peninsula, which is disputed between Russia and Ukraine)
Leninsky District, Sevastopol, an administrative district of the federal city of Sevastopol (located on the Crimean Peninsula, which is disputed between Russia and Ukraine)

City divisions
Leninsky City District, Astrakhan, a city district of Astrakhan, the administrative center of Astrakhan Oblast
Leninsky City District, Barnaul, a city district of Barnaul, the administrative center of Altai Krai
Leninsky City District, Cheboksary, a city district of Cheboksary, the capital of the Chuvash Republic
Leninsky City District, Chelyabinsk, an administrative and municipal city district of Chelyabinsk, the administrative center of Chelyabinsk Oblast
Leninsky City District, Grozny, a city district of Grozny, the capital of the Chechen Republic
Leninsky City District, Irkutsk, a city district of Irkutsk, the administrative center of Irkutsk Oblast
Leninsky City District, Ivanovo, a city district of Ivanovo, the administrative center of Ivanovo Oblast
Leninsky City District, Izhevsk, a city district of Izhevsk, the capital of the Udmurt Republic
Leninsky Okrug, Kaluga, an okrug of the city of Kaluga, the administrative center of Kaluga Oblast
Leninsky City District, Kemerovo, a city district of Kemerovo, the administrative center of Kemerovo Oblast
Leninsky City District, Kirov, a city district of Kirov, the administrative center of Kirov Oblast
Leninsky City District, Krasnoyarsk, a city district of Krasnoyarsk, the administrative center of Krasnoyarsk Krai
Leninsky City District, Magnitogorsk, a city district of Magnitogorsk, a city in Chelyabinsk Oblast
Leninsky City District, Makhachkala, an administrative and municipal city district of Makhachkala, the capital of the Republic of Dagestan
Leninsky Administrative Okrug, Murmansk, an administrative okrug of the city of Murmansk, the administrative center of Murmansk Oblast
Leninsky City District, Nizhny Novgorod, a city district of Nizhny Novgorod, the administrative center of Nizhny Novgorod Oblast
Leninsky City District, Nizhny Tagil, a city district of Nizhny Tagil, a city in Sverdlovsk Oblast
Leninsky City District, Novosibirsk, a city district of Novosibirsk, the administrative center of Novosibirsk Oblast
Leninsky Administrative Okrug, Omsk, an administrative okrug of the city of Omsk, the administrative center of Omsk Oblast
Leninsky City District, Orenburg, a city district of Orenburg, the administrative center of Orenburg Oblast
Leninsky City District, Orsk, a city district of Orsk, a city in Orenburg Oblast
Leninsky City District, Penza, a city district of Penza, the administrative center of Penza Oblast
Leninsky City District, Perm, a city district of Perm, the administrative center of Perm Krai
Leninsky City District, Rostov-on-Don, a city district of Rostov-on-Don, the administrative center of Rostov Oblast
Leninsky City District, Samara, an administrative and municipal city district of Samara, the administrative center of Samara Oblast
Leninsky City District, Saransk, a city district of Saransk, the capital of the Republic of Mordovia
Leninsky City District, Saratov, a city district of Saratov, the administrative center of Saratov Oblast
Leninsky City District, Smolensk, a city district of Smolensk, the administrative center of Smolensk Oblast
Leninsky City District, Stavropol, a city district of Stavropol, the administrative center of Stavropol Krai
Leninsky City District, Tambov, a city district of Tambov, the administrative center of Tambov Oblast
Leninsky City District, Tomsk, a city district of Tomsk, the administrative center of Tomsk Oblast
Leninsky Administrative Okrug, Tyumen, an administrative okrug of the city of Tyumen, the administrative center of Tyumen Oblast
Leninsky City District, Ufa, a city district of Ufa, the capital of the Republic of Bashkortostan
Leninsky City District, Ulyanovsk, a city district of Ulyanovsk, the administrative center of Ulyanovsk Oblast
Leninsky City District, Vladimir, a city district of Vladimir, the administrative center of Vladimir Oblast
Leninsky City District, Vladivostok, a city district of Vladivostok, the administrative center of Primorsky Krai
Leninsky City District, Voronezh, a city district of Voronezh, the administrative center of Voronezh Oblast
Leninsky City District, Yaroslavl, a city district of Yaroslavl, the administrative center of Yaroslavl Oblast
Leninsky City District, Yekaterinburg, a city district of Yekaterinburg, the administrative center of Sverdlovsk Oblast

Renamed districts
Leninsky District, name of Karabudakhkentsky District of the Republic of Dagestan in 1962–1992
Leninsky District, name of Nyurbinsky District of the Sakha Republic until 1992
Leninsky District, name of Taldomsky District of Moscow Oblast in 1929—1930

Historical districts
Leninsky District, Kalinin Oblast, a district which existed in Western Oblast, Kalinin Oblast, and Velikiye Luki Oblast between 1927 and 1963.
Leninsky District, Saint Petersburg, a district of the federal city of St. Petersburg; merged into the newly established Admiralteysky District in March 1994

See also
Leninsky (disambiguation)
Leninsky Okrug (disambiguation)

References